Anton Kanstantsinavich Putsila (born 23 June 1987) is a Belarusian professional footballer who plays for Dinamo Minsk. He made 56 appearances for the Belarus national team scoring six goals.

Club career
Born in Orsha, Putsila played youth football at RUOR Minsk before signing a professional contract with Dinamo Minsk in January 2004. Before his loan to Hamburger SV he appeared 21 times in 2007 as a midfielder for Dinamo Minsk in the Belarusian Premier League, scoring one goal.

He was loaned to Hamburg in January 2008 for a fee of €500,000. In the second half of the 2007–08 season, he made three Bundesliga appearances for Hamburger SV, coming on as a substitute each time.

On 21 June 2010, he announced his move to SC Freiburg on a free transfer on 1 January 2011.

International career
Putsila played for the Belarus national under-17 team, and the Belarus national under-21 team, earning six caps and scoring one goal. He made his debut for the senior Belarus national team on 2 February 2008.

Career statistics
Scores and results list Belarus' goal tally first, score column indicates score after each Putsila goal.

Honours
Dinamo Minsk
Belarusian Premier League: 2004

References

External links
 
 
 
 
 

1987 births
Living people
People from Orsha
Sportspeople from Vitebsk Region
Belarusian footballers
Association football midfielders
Belarus international footballers
Russian Premier League players
Bundesliga players
FC RUOR Minsk players
FC Dinamo Minsk players
Hamburger SV players
SC Freiburg players
FC Volga Nizhny Novgorod players
FC Torpedo Moscow players
Gaziantepspor footballers
MKE Ankaragücü footballers
Altay S.K. footballers
Belarusian expatriate footballers
Belarusian expatriate sportspeople in Germany
Expatriate footballers in Germany
Belarusian expatriate sportspeople in Russia
Expatriate footballers in Russia
Belarusian expatriate sportspeople in Turkey
Expatriate footballers in Turkey